Karl K. Rebane (11 April 1926, in Pärnu – 4 November 2007, in Pärnu)  was an Estonian physicist.

He studied at the Tallinn Technical University from 1947 to 1949, and graduated from Leningrad University in 1952. Rebane received a PhD in Solid State Theory in 1955 from the Leningrad (St. Petersburg) University and a Doctor of Science degree in Theoretical Physics in 1964 from the Institute of Physics of the Belarusian AS at Minsk. He joined Tartu University in 1955 where he held both teaching and administrative positions, including Professor and Chair of the Experimental Physics Department (1958–60), and Professor and Chair of the Joint Department of Laser Optics at the Institute of Physics and Tartu University (1974–1993). He was president of the Estonian Academy of Sciences from 1973 to 1990.

Early life
Karl Rebane was born on April 11, 1926 in Pärnu, Estonia. His father, Karl Rebane sr, was a bookkeeper. He was the second oldest out of five children.
The war reached Estonia in 1941 and his family evacuated to a small village in the oblast of Chelyabinsk where he worked at the local kolkhoz and attended a school for displaced Estonian children in Verkhneuralsk. In the spring of 1944, he was called into military service and joined Eesti Laskurkorpus, an Estonian division of the Red Army, where he was a crew member of a 45 mm antitank gun. He was wounded in battle on November 23, 1944 on the Sõrve peninsula, Estonia.

Awards and honours
For research and scientific activity:
1965 -  
1981 -  from the Academy of Sciences of the Soviet Union for achievements in the field of Physics 
1986 -  
1986 - Hero of Socialist Labour, Order of the Red Banner of Labour, Order of Lenin
1993 - Humboldt Research Award (Germany) 
1996 - Estonian National Research Award (as part of a collective) for research work in exact sciences, chemistry, and biology 
2000 - Order of Friendship of the Russian Federation 
2001 - Estonian National Research Award for outstanding lifetime achievements in research and development 
2002 - Royal Norwegian Order of Merit
2003 - Cariplo Research Fellowship (Italy) 
2006 - Order of the White Star Class III

Family
He was married to Ljubov Rebane, and had two children, Inna and Aleksander Rebane. He also had three brothers, Jaan, Toomas, and Jüri Rebane. His granddaughter is writer and mathematician Helju Rebane.

References

20th-century Estonian physicists
Saint Petersburg State University alumni
People from Pärnu
1926 births
2007 deaths
Tallinn University of Technology alumni
Academic staff of the University of Tartu
Recipients of the Order of the White Star, 3rd Class
Soviet military personnel of World War II